Bhaur is a mountain range in Pakistan.

Bhaur may also refer to:
 Bhaur (Caste), an Indian/Pakistani caste
 Sukhdev Singh Bhaur, Indian politician; see Jagir Kaur
 Muhammad Hanif Bhaur, Chief Engineer, Pakistan
 Muhammad Azam Bhaur, Civil Judge, Pakistan
 Meem Hasan Lateefi Bhaur, Poet, Ludhiana, India

See also
 Bhaura (disambiguation)
 Bhauri, a village in the Bhopal district of Madhya Pradesh, India